Ray David Grammont (12 October 1967 in Paris – 16 February 2021 in Nancy, France), better known under his stage name Tonton David was a French Reggae singer born in Réunion. He was renowned for his raggamuffin performances, but used influences of soul music, gro kâ (from the French West Indies), the Zairian rumba.

Biography
Tonton David had a turbulent childhood in a suburb of Paris. He left his family aged 14 and had a successful career in music with songs featuring powerful and political lyrics. In 1990, Tonton David had his big break when he was featured in a TV report about "Black Paris". Following that performance, Tonton David was signed by the Virgin record label. Shortly after, he recorded "Peuples du monde", which was featured in French rap compilation Rapattitudes.

Le blues de la racaille released on 2 December 1991, was his debut album in which he explored social issues such as unemployment, poverty and racism, becoming a figurehead for a whole generation of disenchanted French youth. In 1991, he performed in front of an audience of 12,000 music fans at the Fête des Kafs in Saint Denis, La Réunion and in 1992 at Reggae Sunsplash festival in Kingston, Jamaica. In 1993, he released his second album Allez leur dire recorded in Memphis, Tennessee. His third album Récidiviste in 1995 included the single "Pour tout le monde pareil" and featured a collaboration with rai star Cheb Mami in "Fugitifs". His fourth album Faut qu'ça arrête was more heavily influenced by Haitian music, after he collaborated with Haitian musician Papa Jube. Victim of a stroke (CVA) in Metz (France), his death was announced 2 days later in hospital of Nancy, on 16 February 2021.

Discography

Albums
1991: Le blues de la racaille
1994: Allez leur dire
1995: Récidiviste
1999: Faut qu'ça arrête
2002: Best Of (compilation album)
2005: Babelou, la gagne
2006: Livret de famille
2006: Il marche seul
2009: Ma gouille

Singles
1990: "Peuple du monde" (FR #32)
1994: "Chacun sa route" (with K.O.D.)
1994: "Sûr et certain" (FR #9)
1994: "Ma Number One" (FR #17)
1994: "Il marche seul" (FR #29)
1995: "Fugitif" (with Cheb Mami (FR #30)
Featured in
2005: "La gagne" (Intouchable feat. Tonton David) (FR #40)

References

1967 births
2021 deaths
French reggae musicians
French reggae singers
Musicians from Réunion

Réunionnais singers